Michael John Boland (October 29, 1954 – October 8, 2017) was a Canadian ice hockey defenceman. He played 23 games in the National Hockey League (NHL) between 1975 and 1979 for the Kansas City Scouts and Buffalo Sabres. The rest of his career, which lasted from 1974 to 1984, was spent in the minor leagues, primarily in the International Hockey League.

Playing career
Boland was drafted in the seventh round, 110th overall, by the Kansas City Scouts in the 1974 NHL amateur draft. He played one game in the National Hockey League with Kansas City in the 1974–75 season and 22 more with the Buffalo Sabres during the 1978–79 season.

In his 23-game NHL career, Boland scored one goal and added two assists.  Boland remained an active hockey player with the Buffalo Sabres Alumni Association, which raises money for various charities around Western New York. His sister Diane is married to his former teammate, Don Luce. Boland died after a period of declining health at a hospital in Amherst, New York in 2017.

Career statistics

Regular season and playoffs

References

External links

1954 births
2017 deaths
Buffalo Sabres players
Canadian expatriate ice hockey players in the United States
Canadian ice hockey defencemen
Fort Wayne Komets players
Hershey Bears players
Ice hockey people from Ontario
London Knights players
Kansas City Scouts draft picks
Kansas City Scouts players
Port Huron Flags (IHL) players
Rochester Americans players
Salt Lake Golden Eagles (CHL) players
San Diego Mariners draft picks
Sault Ste. Marie Greyhounds players
Sportspeople from London, Ontario